Chlorophorus aritai is a species of beetle in the family Cerambycidae. It was described by Ohbayashi in 1964.

References

Clytini
Beetles described in 1964